Ean may refer to:

People
 Ean Campbell (1856–1921), Anglican bishop in the early 20th century
 Ean Elliot Clevenger, multi-instrumentalist, vocalist, and songwriter
 Ean Evans (1960–2009), bassist for Lynyrd Skynyrd from 2001 until his death
 Ean Randolph (born 1984), former American and Canadian football wide receiver

Other uses
 Emergency Action Notification (SAME code: EAN), the national activation of the Emergency Alert System
 Ethylammonium nitrate, a salt with formula 
 European Academy of Neurology, a non-profit organisation that unites and supports neurologists across the whole of Europe
 International Article Number (also European Article Number or EAN), a standard describing a barcode symbology and numbering system
 European Aviation Network, a hybrid terrestrial and satellite aviation network
 Skypower Express Airways (ICAO code: EAN), an airline based in Kaduna in Nigeria